The Western classical tradition is the reception of classical Greco-Roman antiquity by later cultures, especially the post-classical West, involving texts, imagery, objects, ideas, institutions, monuments, architecture, cultural artifacts, rituals, practices, and sayings. Philosophy, political thought, and mythology are three major examples of how classical culture survives and continues to have influence. The West is one of a number of world cultures regarded as having a classical tradition, including the Indian, Chinese, and Islamic traditions.

The study of the classical tradition differs from classical philology, which seeks to recover "the meanings that ancient texts had in their original contexts." It examines both later efforts to uncover the realities of the Greco-Roman world and "creative misunderstandings" that reinterpret ancient values, ideas and aesthetic models for contemporary use. The classicist and translator Charles Martindale has defined the reception of classical antiquity as "a two-way process … in which the present and the past are in dialogue with each other."

History
The beginning of a self-conscious classical tradition is usually located in the Renaissance, with the work of Petrarch in 14th-century Italy. Although Petrarch believed that he was recovering an unobstructed view of a classical past that had been obscured for centuries, the classical tradition in fact had continued uninterrupted during the Middle Ages. There was no single moment of rupture when the inhabitants of what was formerly the Roman Empire went to bed in antiquity and awoke in the medieval world; rather, the cultural transformation occurred over centuries. The use and meaning of the classical tradition may seem, however, to change dramatically with the emergence of humanism.

The phrase "classical tradition" is itself a modern label, articulated most notably in the post-World War II era with The Classical Tradition: Greek and Roman Influences on Western Literature of Gilbert Highet (1949) and The Classical Heritage and Its Beneficiaries of R. R. Bolgar (1954). The English word "tradition," and with it the concept of "handing down" classical culture, derives from the Latin verb trado, tradere, traditus, in the sense of "hand over, hand down."

Writers and artists influenced by the classical tradition may name their ancient models, or allude to their works. Often scholars infer classical influence through comparative methods that reveal patterns of thought. Sometimes authors' copies of Greek and Latin texts will contain handwritten annotations that offer direct evidence of how they read and understood their classical models; for instance, in the late 20th century the discovery of Montaigne's copy of Lucretius enabled scholars to document an influence that had long been recognized.

See also

References

Further reading
 Barkan, Leonard. Unearthing the Past: Archaeology and Aesthetics in the Making of Renaissance Culture. Yale University Press, 1999).
 Cook, William W., and Tatum, James. African American Writers and Classical Tradition. University of Chicago Press, 2010.
 
 Walker, Lewis. Shakespeare and the Classical Tradition: An Annotated Bibliography 1961–1991. Routledge, 2002.

Classical antiquity
Cultural heritage
Cultural appropriation
Admiration of foreign cultures
Western culture
Western art
Western philosophy
Latin-language literature
History of poetry
History of literature
Medieval literature
Renaissance literature
Renaissance humanism
Legacy of the Roman Empire